The 1976–77 season was Chelsea Football Club's sixty-third competitive season.

Table

References

External links
 1976–77 season at stamford-bridge.com

1976–77
English football clubs 1976–77 season